Enoch Rowley was a footballer who played one game for Burslem Port Vale in January 1905.

Career
Rowley played for Biddulph before joining Second Division side Burslem Port Vale in September 1904. His only known appearance came at outside-left in a 1–0 loss to Glossop at the Athletic Ground on 7 January 1905. He was released at the end of that season.

Career statistics
Source:

References

Year of birth missing
Year of death missing
English footballers
Association football forwards
Port Vale F.C. players
English Football League players